The Kakamatua Inlet is an inlet of the Manukau Harbour of the Auckland Region of New Zealand's North Island.

Geography 

The Kakamatua Inlet is bordered between Huia to the west and the Karangahape Peninsula and settlement of Cornwallis to the east. It is the point where the Kakamatua Stream reaches the Manukau Harbour.

History 

The creek is in the traditional rohe of the iwi Te Kawerau ā Maki and other Tāmaki Māori. The location was given the name after Te Kawerau ā Maki returned to West Auckland after the Musket Wars and settled at Kakamatua in 1836. The name "Kakamātua" referenced Te Mātua and Te Kaka Whakaara, the head land and the pā at Karekare which were attacked in 1825 during the Musket Wars. After six months and fears of attacks subsided, the iwi moved to the Te Henga / Bethells Beach area.

In the 1860s, New Zealand settler Mathew Roe obtained rights for kauri logging in the valley, building a sawmill at the Kakamatua Inlet at the mouth of the Kakamatua Stream. When he exhausted the kauri resources of the lower valley,  Roe constructed a driving dam on the Kakamatua River further up-stream, in order to send logs down the river towards the mill. The sawmill operated until the 1870s.

The inlet was close to the sinking location of the HMS Orpheus, which sunk in the Manukau Harbour in 1863. Many of the victims of the shipwreck were buried near the inlet.

References

Inlets of New Zealand
Manukau Harbour
Musket Wars
Te Kawerau ā Maki
Waitākere Ranges Local Board Area
West Auckland, New Zealand